The 1941 Utah Redskins football team was an American football team that represented the University of Utah as a member of the Mountain States Conference (MSC) during the 1941 college football season. In their 17th season under head coach Ike Armstrong, the Redskins compiled an overall record of 6–0–2 with a mark of 4–0–2 against conference opponents, won the MSC championship, and all outscored opponents by a total of 209 to 65. The team played its home games at Ute Stadium in Salt Lake City.

Schedule

After the season

NFL Draft
Utah had two players selected in the 1942 NFL Draft.

References

Utah
Utah Utes football seasons
Mountain States Conference football champion seasons
College football undefeated seasons
Utah Redskins football